A Street Man Named Desire is the third studio album by American country music band Pirates of the Mississippi. Released in 1992 as their first album for Liberty Records, it produced a minor chart single in its title track, which was also the only chart single from it.

Content
The album's title track charted on Billboard Hot Country Songs in 1992. Members of the band noted that the song was subject to controversy: a representative of Bill Clinton, then the Democratic Party's nominee for President of the United States, wanted to use the song in Clinton's campaign. Conversely, a friend of George H. W. Bush, who was President at the time, called a station that was playing the song regularly and demanded that it be withdrawn from rotation.

Critical reception
Rating it 3 out of 4 stars, Jack Hurst of Tribune Media wrote that the band "possess a swingy ear-friendliness as well as a gift for the occasional stunning lyric."

Track listing
"Don't Quit Your Day Job" (Rich Alves, Bill McCorvey, Roger Murrah) – 3:13
"Room at the Bottom" (J. Fred Knobloch, Kevin Welch) – 4:45
"Ain't Got No Idea" (Alves, McCorvey, Steve Dean) – 2:39
"All That Your Eyes See" (Alves, McCorvey, Gary Harrison) – 3:44
"Mystery Ship" (instrumental) (Alves, McCorvey, Pat Severs, Jimmy Lowe, Dean Townson) – 4:08
"My Kinda Woman" (Danny Mayo, Freddy Weller) – 2:59
"Some Things Never Change" (McCorvey, Harrison) – 3:41
"Mississippi Homegrown" (Alves, McCorvey, Harrison) – 4:53
"A Street Man Named Desire"  (Alves, McCorvey, Harrison) – 4:53
"The Hard Side of Love" (Alves, David Malloy, Jerry Taylor) – 3:51
"Just for You" (Alves, McCorvey, Townson, John Paul Daniel) – 4:37

Personnel
Pirates of the Mississippi
 Richard Alves - guitar, background vocals
 Jimmy Lowe - drums, background vocals
 Bill McCorvey - guitar, lead vocals
 Pat Severs - steel guitar, Dobro, lap steel guitar, "Cheezy organ steel", background vocals, acoustic guitar
 Dean Townson - bass guitar, background vocals

 Additional musician
 John Kelton - strings

Technical
 Rich Alves - production
 Jimmy Bowen - production
 John Kelton - recording, overdubbing, mixing
 Tim Kish - recording, overdubbing, mixing
 Glenn Meadows - mastering, digital editing

Chart performance

References

1992 albums
Liberty Records albums
Pirates of the Mississippi albums
Albums produced by Jimmy Bowen